Arca imbricata, or the Mossy ark clam, is a clam in the family Arcidae. It can be found along the Atlantic coast of North America, ranging from North Carolina to the West Indies, Brazil, and Bermuda.

Description
Arca imbricata grows to about 2 ins (5 cm) in length. The valves have a roughly rectangular shape with a rounded anterior end and a slightly pointed posterior end. They are usually purplish-white in colour, but live specimens are covered in a thin brown protective periostracum. There are some distinct ribs on the posterior end and the margin is smooth. The hinge is long and straight with a number of fine teeth.

References

Arcidae
Bivalves described in 1789